Jared Tozier Spears (born August 15, 1936) is an American composer and music teacher.

Biography 
Spears was born in Chicago, Illinois.

Spears attended the Northern Illinois University in DeKalb, Illinois and earned his Bachelor of Science in education, business technology (BSE). He also studied percussion and composition from the Cosmopolitan School of Music in Chicago, where he received his bachelor's and master's degrees in music. He then studied at the Northwestern University in Chicago and received his Ph.D. in composition. Among his teachers were Blyth Own, Alan Stout and Anthony Donato.

Spears taught music theory, music history, composition and percussion in both high schools and in universities. By 1999 he had worked 32 years in education before retirement. He is a professor emeritus of the Arkansas State University (ASU) in Jonesboro, Arkansas.

As a composer he wrote more than 300 works for concert band, choir, orchestra and ensembles. As a conductor he was a popular guest in the United States, Canada and Europe at festivals, youth camps and clinics. He received numerous awards and honors such as the Faricy Award for creative music from Northwestern University School of Music, the "Award of Merit" from the board of the Arkansas department of the National Federation of Music Clubs and the American Society of Composers, Authors and Publishers (ASCAP).

Compositions

Works for orchestra 
 Dance Diabolique, for string orchestra
 Hill Point Fantasy - Overture for Orchestra

Compositions for band 
 1969 Kimberly Overture
 1970 Dramatic Episode
 1970 Neologue
 1971 Chatham Overture
 1972 Third Set
 1972 Prologue and Pageant, suite
 1973 Chronolog
 1974 A Wind River Portrait
 1974 Meditation and Festiva
 1974 Triolog
 1976 Premiere Passacaglia
 1976 Wilderness Overture
 1977 Momentations
 1978 Novelette
 1979 Alleluias
 1979 Forest Park Overture
 1980 At a Dixieland Jazz Funeral (for Concert Band with Dixieland Jazz Combo)
 1981 Cantique and Festival
 1981 Day of the Shofar
 1981 Ritual and Capriccio
 1981 Scenario
 1982 Canticles
 1982 Crestview
 1982 Thunder Mountain Overture
 1983 Prayer and Proclamation
 1984 New Century Overture
 1985 Westward Trails - General Words and Music
 1985 March of the Martian Chickens
 1986 Axon
 1986 Jubilations
 1986 Lament and Caprice
 1986 Praeludium - based on chorale "Praise ye the Lord", the Almighty 1987 Colorama Overture 1987 Cannon Beach Overture 1987 Mission Creek 1987 New River Suite 1987 Roaring Mountain Overture 1987 Sentinel Overture 1989 Images and Faces from a World 1990 Castles of Llyr 1992 Spiritual 1993 The Water of the Myth 1996 Bravo! 1996 A Gathering of Angels 1997 Jubilation Overture 1998 The Adventurers 2000 Joyous Alleluias 2002 Mountain View Portrait 2005 Of Times Medieval - based on chorale "Veni Creator Spiritus"
 2006 Return to Wind River A Furious Fable A Maverick Overture A Sacred Set Affirmation Cahokia Cantilena Collocation for Winds and Percussion Colorado Blue Country Cameos, suite
 Cyber Quest Dawn Seeker Deo Gratias Fiesta Nueva From a Schumann Album Heartland Sketches Heritage Hill Images Diabolique Legacy - Concerto, for three solo percussionists and band
 March for Moderns Northstar Overture Novena Of Honor, Joy and Celebration Of Land and Sea On Eagles' Wings Ozark Folk Suite Ritual and Celebration Sansketch Spirit Canyon March Star Gazer Star March Stormy Point Overture Suite Romantique Sun Island Overture The Brass Ring The Dream Chasers The Drums of Blackhawk The Freedom Chronicles The River Red Wabash County Saga Westwood Portrait Where Legends Live Wind River Overture Chamber music
 1997 A Kensington Portrait, for trombone quartet
 Colossus, for trombone quartet
 Divertimento for Tuba Ensemble Invention
 Melodrama
 Dance
 Chorale
 Toccata
 Stratford Point, for trombone quartet

 Works for percussion 
 Allegro Fantastica, for percussion quartet
 A Time For Jazz Bayport Sketch Caccia Caper Cameo Suite March For Mopeds
 Dreamscape
 Caper
 Ceremonium Collidescope Collisions Country Variations Dynamo Incantation And Festal Dance, for percussion octet
 Malletrix Mosaics Proclamations Ragtime Renegade Run, for percussion sextet
 Scamper Spiritus!, for percussion quintet 
 Two Episodes Two Frescos Windstone Suite Windstone
 Drone Dance
 Distant Songs & Incantations
 Visions & Jubilations
 Woodworks Bibliography 
 Wolfgang Suppan, Armin Suppan: Das Neue Lexikon des Blasmusikwesens, 4. Auflage, Freiburg-Tiengen, Blasmusikverlag Schulz GmbH, 1994, 
 Paul E. Bierley, William H. Rehrig: The heritage encyclopedia of band music : composers and their music, Westerville, Ohio: Integrity Press, 1991, 
 Jean-Marie Londeix: Musique pour saxophone, volume II : répertoire général des oeuvres et des ouvrages d' enseignement pour le saxophone, Cherry Hill: Roncorp Publications, 1985.
 E. Ruth Anderson: Contemporary American composers - A biographical dictionary, Second edition, Boston: G. K. Hall, 1982, 578 p., 
 James R. Pebworth: A directory of 132 Arkansas composers'', Fayetteville, Arkansas: University Library, University of Arkansas, 1979, 89 p.

External links 
 Jared Spears - Kendor Music
 Dr. Jared Spears - Alfred Music

American male classical composers
American classical composers
American male conductors (music)
Composers of Christian music
20th-century classical composers
21st-century classical composers
American music educators
1936 births
Living people
21st-century American composers
20th-century American composers
20th-century American conductors (music)
21st-century American conductors (music)
20th-century American male musicians
21st-century American male musicians